The Ecuadorian grass mouse (Neomicroxus latebricola) is a species of rodent in the family Cricetidae.
It is found only in Ecuador.

References

Alavarado-Serrano, D. F. and G. D'Elía. 2013. A new genus for the Andean mice Akodon latebricola and A. bogotensis. (Rodentia: Sigmodontinae). Journal of Mammalogy, 94:995–1015.

Neomicroxus
Endemic fauna of Ecuador
Mammals of Ecuador
Rodents of South America
Vulnerable animals
Vulnerable biota of South America
Mammals described in 1924
Taxonomy articles created by Polbot